Anthony Crane may refer to:

 Anthony Crane (born 1963), American pornographic actor
 Tony Crane (born 1982), English footballer
 J. Anthony Crane (born 1972), American  stage and screen actor
 Tony Crane (musician) (born 1945), British musician